Biloxi Parish was a parish (county) of the Territory of Orleans, formed in 1811 from the formerly Spanish West Florida colony. It was eliminated in 1812, the same year that Louisiana became a U.S. state, when the Gulf of Mexico coastal lands (between the Pearl River and the Perdido River) were transferred to the Mississippi Territory. It was a U.S. territorial jurisdiction which existed for approximately one year. It was located in the area which is today the coastal part of the state of Mississippi.

Former parishes of Louisiana